Ralph K. Mullins aka Diz Mullins (born 10 May 1929 in Tulsa) is an American jazz trumpet player, arranger, composer, and collegiate educator.  He grew up in Oklahoma but spent most of his professional career in the Los Angeles area.  After  years of playing trumpet in Southern California, Mullins is still playing and leads his own band.

Career highlights 
Around 1954, Mullins moved to Los Angeles, where he began playing with the Tommy Alexander Band.  The jazz musicians he performed with include Dave Wells, Lanny Morgan, Bob Hathaway, and Don Bagley. Mullins played trumpet and arranged for four years with Charlie Barnet's Big Band.  He also performed with Anita O’Day's Sextet, Woody Herman, Sy Zentner,  Russ Morgan, and Freddy Martin, with whom he worked a year on a TV show and two years at the Coconut Grove.

Mullins has scored over 400 feature films including Rocky I, II, and III, Barbra Streisand's A Star Is Born, Roots, the TV mini series, The Autobiography of Jane Pitman, The Merv Griffin Show, and The Hollywood Palace. He scored for Frank Sinatra, Sarah Vaughan, Rosemary Clooney, recorded with Charlie Barnet's Big Band (five albums) alongside of Maynard Ferguson, Al Porcino, and Buddy Childers.  In scoring and performing, he has worked with numerous TV shows including Bonanza, Red Skelton, Smothers Brothers, Andy Griffith, Matlock, Perry Mason, and has also worked with Quincy Jones, Dave Grusin, Elmer Bernstein.

Educator 
Mullins was a member of the Film Scoring Department faculty at the University of Southern California from 1996 to 2006.  He has also taught at the Dick Grove School of Music.

Formal education 
 Studied music, music education, psychology at the University of Tulsa from 1947 to 1951
 University of Oklahoma, Bachelor of Music Education
 University of Southern California, studied music

Selected discography 
As trumpet sideman
 Charlie Barnet, Lonely Street, Verve MGV2040 (1956) 
 First session: recorded September 24, 1956, Hollywood, California
 Carleton McBeath, Conrad Gozzo, Ralph Mullins (trumpets); Richard Nash, Dave Wells, Bob Burgess, Ernest Small (trombones); Charlie Barnet (sax, leader), Willie Smith (alto sax); Willis "Bill" Leonard Holman (Bill Holman's brother) (tenor saxes); Bob Dawes (bari sax); William Miller, Norman Pockrandt, Russ Garcia (pianists); Robert Bain (guitar); Eudice Shapiro, Robert Sushel, Amerigo Rickey Marino, William R. Kurasch, Tibor Zelig, Benny Gill (violins); Allan Harshman, Louis Kievman, Dan Lube (violas); Raphael Ray Kramer (cello); Red Wootten (bass); Bill Richmond (drums); Russ Garcia (arranger)
 20405-4: "The moon was yellow," arranged by Russ Garcia
 20406-11: "Myna," arranged by Russ Garcia
 20407-6: "You'd be so nice to come home to," arranged by Russ Garcia
 20408-10: "Phyllysse," arranged by Russ Garcia
 Second session: recorded November 8, 1956, Hollywood, California
 Maynard Ferguson, Ralph Mullins, Carleton McBeath, Oliver Mitchell (trumpets); Leroy Anderson, Dave Wells, Bob Burgess, Richard Nash (trombones); Charlie Barnet (sax, leader); Willie Smith, Dick Paladino (alto saxes); Bill Holman (tenor sax, arranger), William Trujillo (tenor saxes); Bob Dawes (bari sax); Norman Pockrandt (piano); Barney Kessel (guitar); Red Wootten (bass); Alvin Stoller (drums); Billy May, Buddy Childers (arranger)
 20460-5: "Blue rose," arranged by Bill Holman
 20461-4: "Lemon twist," arranged by Bill Holman
 20462-2: "Lumby," arranged by Billy May
 20463-2: "Hear me talkin' to you," arranged by Buddy Childers

 Charlie Barnet
 Diz Mullins, Jack Hohlman, Art Depew, Bobby Clark (trumpets); (3 trombonists); Charlie Barnet (sax, leader, arranger); Bob Jung, Bob Dawes (woodwinds); 2 or 3 others (woodwinds); Fred Massey (piano); Don Prell (bass); Don Manning (drums); Lynn Franklin (vocal); Andy Gibson, Paul Villepigue, Bill Holman, Neal Hefti, Ralph Burns, Tiny Kahn, Manny Albam, Billy May (arrangers)
 Recorded May 30 thru June 8, 1957, Saltair Ballroom, Salt Lake City
 KDYL broadcast, June 5, 1957, Saltair Ballroom, Salt Lake City
 Russ Garcia added to the preceding personnel

 Charlie Barnet Orchestra: Record Hop, (film soundtrack featuring Charlie Barnet and His Orchestra), Zephyrhills, Florida: Joyce Records LP3001 (1957)
 Diz Mullins (trumpet); Charlie Barnet (sax, leader); Fred Massey (piano); Tex Williams, Alan Copeland, Ella Mae Morse (vocals); Manny Albam, Russ Garcia (arrangers); The Lancers (vocal group); others not listed
 Recorded October 1957, Hollywood, California

 Charlie Barnet, One Night Stand, Joyce Records LP1052, 1008 
 Diz Mullins, Al Porcino, Sanford Skinner, Stu Williamson (trumpets); Walt Malzahn, Dave Wells, Frank Lane (trombones); Charlie Barnet (sax, leader); Bob Jung, Lanny Morgan (alto sax); Jack Kernan, Dave Madden (tenor saxes); Bob Dawes (bari sax); Buddy Motsinger (piano); Harry Babasin (bass); Jack Sperling (drums); Lynn Franklin (vocal); Bill Holman (arranger)
 KFI broadcast, September 5, 1958, Hollywood Palladium

As arranger
 Amy Grant, A Christmas to Remember, with the Patrick Williams Orchestra, A&M Records (1999) 
 Mullins contributed to the Los Angeles music preparation (transcribing, scoring)
 Horatio, Capitol P-2489 (May 1969) 
 Side A: "I can't be a cowboy if I can't carry a gun," composed by Joan Mullins & Robert O. Williams, arranged by Ralph Mullins (matrix 45-S-72097-A1)
 Side B: "The golden rule" (matrix 45-S-72098-A1)

References 

1929 births
Living people
American jazz trumpeters
American male trumpeters
Swing trumpeters
Musicians from Oklahoma
University of Oklahoma alumni
University of Southern California faculty
21st-century trumpeters
Jazz musicians from Oklahoma
21st-century American male musicians
American male jazz musicians